Cape Liddon is an uninhabited headland on Devon Island in the Qikiqtaaluk Region of Nunavut, Canada. It is located on the southwestern coast of the island at Radstock Bay.

Geography

Fauna
The cape is a Canadian Important Bird Area (#NU059), an International Biological Program site (Region 9, #2-15) and a Key Migratory Bird Terrestrial Habitat Site. Notable bird species include black guillemot and northern fulmar.

References

 Cape Liddon at the Atlas of Canada

Peninsulas of Qikiqtaaluk Region
Important Bird Areas of Qikiqtaaluk Region
Important Bird Areas of Arctic islands
Seabird colonies
Liddon